is a district located in Hiyama Subprefecture, Hokkaido, Japan.

As of 2004, the district has an estimated population of 2,458 and a density of 18.36 persons per km2. The total area is 133.91 km2.

Towns and villages
Setana (Taisei and Kitahiyama were merged into Setana in 2005)

Districts in Hokkaido